Uthai Boonmoh, is a Thai football manager.

References

External links
https://www.livesoccer888.com/staff/Uthai-Boonmoh
https://us.soccerway.com/coaches/uthai-boonmoh/474227/

Living people
Uthai Boonmoh
Uthai Boonmoh
Uthai Boonmoh
1970 births
Uthai Boonmoh